László Lukács (1850–1932) was a Hungarian politician who served as Prime Minister of the Kingdom of Hungary

László Lukács (Lukács László in the Western name order) may also refer to:

 László György Lukács (born 1983), Hungarian lawyer and politician serving in the Hungarian National Assembly
 László Lukács (politician, 1963) (born 1963), Hungarian politician who served in the Hungarian National Assembly
 Lukács László, a member of the Hungarian heavy metal and hard rock band Tankcsapda